The Sideling Creek Dam is an earth-fill embankment dam with an un-gated spillway across the Sideling Creek in Kurwongbah, Moreton Bay Region,  Queensland, Australia. The main purposes of the dam are for potable water supply of the Moreton Bay Region and for recreation. The impounded reservoir is called Lake Kurwongbah.

Location and features
The primary inflow is Sideling Creek, a tributary of the North Pine River. To the east of the dam is the Lakeside Park motor racing circuit.

The  dam wall holds back the  reservoir when at full capacity. The dam is now managed by Seqwater.

From April 2018 to May 2020, Seqwater carried out an upgrade of Sideling Creek Dam as part of its Dam Improvement Program.

Recreational activities
Access to Lake Kurwongbah is via Dayboro Road, with picnic facilities located at Mick Hanfling Park on the lake's eastern shores. Water skiing is allowed and rowing is another popular recreational activity provided by the dam. The lake has been used for professional level radio controlled model yacht competitions, although has moved more recently to a pond adjacent to the motor racing circuit at Lakeside Park. It was the proposed venue for rowing in Brisbane's failed bid for the 1992 Olympic Games.

Motor racing has been held Lakeside International Raceway, as it was originally known since 1961 and has hosted the Australian Grand Prix and Australian Touring Car Championship, amongst other events.

Fishing
The reservoir is stocked with silver perch, golden perch and bass. Spangled perch and forktail catfish are present in the dam naturally. Only bank angling is permitted on Lake Kurwongbah.

See also

List of dams in Queensland

References

Notes

2 Pine Rivers Rowing Club has been Active since 1958 at this dam. The Dam level was raised in 1969, enabling the Australian Rowing Championships to be held here in 1972.

External links
 Lake Kurwongbah Fishing Information

Buildings and structures in Moreton Bay Region
Dams in Queensland
Kurwongbah
Embankment dams
Earth-filled dams
Dams completed in 1958
1958 establishments in Australia